, officially , is a district of Chiyoda, Tokyo, Japan. As of April 1, 2007, its population is 33. Its postal code is 101-0026.

This district is located on the northeastern part of Chiyoda Ward. It borders Kanda-Sakumachō on the north, (across Mikura Bridge) Higashi-Kanda 3-chōme on the east, (across Kanda River) Iwamotochō 3-chōme and Higashi-Kanda 2-chōme on the south, and (across Izumi Bridge of Shōwa-dōri Avenue) Kanda-Sakumachō 1-chōme on the west.

An exit of Akihabara Station of Tokyo Metro Hibiya Line is located within the district.

Education
 operates public elementary and junior high schools. Izumi Elementary School (和泉小学校) is the zoned elementary school for Sakumagashi. There is a freedom of choice system for junior high schools in Chiyoda Ward, and so there are no specific junior high school zones.

References

Districts of Chiyoda, Tokyo